As seen on TV is a generic nameplate for products advertised on television in the United States for direct-response mail-order through a toll-free telephone number. As Seen on TV advertisements, known as infomercials, are usually 30-minute shows or two-minute spots during commercial breaks. These products can range from kitchen, household, automotive, cleaning, health, and beauty products, to exercise and fitness products, books, or to toys and games for children. Typically the packaging for these items includes a standardized red seal in the shape of a CRT television screen with the words "AS SEEN ON TV" in white, an intentional allusion to the logo of TV Guide magazine.

Prominent marketers of As seen on TV products include As Seen on TV, Inc., Time-Life, Space Bag, K-tel, Ronco, and Thane. There are also retail brick-and-mortar and online stores that specifically sell As seen on TV products.

In 1996, "As seen on TV" then moved on to retail, according to A. J. Khubani, CEO of Telebrands, who designed the logo.

As seen on TV products then moved on to sell on the internet. In 2015, a new As seen on TV corporation was formed and launched as a multi-vendor marketplace, allowing manufacturers and sellers of TV products to sell their inventory through its website New Easy.

The red logo and phrase is now in the public domain and can be used on packaging or in business with no fee and without trademark infringement.

Companies that produce generic versions of As seen on TV products may use a modified version of the red logo, their version displaying "Like on TV" or "As seen on TV in some countries". This logo can be registered in some countries like a trademark.

See also 
 Brand-new
 Infomercial
 Not sold in stores

References 

Online marketplaces of the United States
American television commercials
Television terminology
Marketing companies of the United States
Television advertising
Companies based in Florida
American inventions